Journey South is the eponymous debut studio album from The X Factor UK series 2 finalists Journey South. It was released on 20 March 2006 and entered the UK Albums Chart on 26 March 2006 at number one, selling 216,000 copies in its first week. The album had sold 414,000 copies as of December 2012.

The album contains covers of The Beatles' "Let It Be", U2's "I Still Haven't Found What I'm Looking For", Cyndi Lauper's Time After Time", Roxette's "It Must Have Been Love", and "English Rose" by The Jam.

Track listing

Charts and certifications

Weekly charts

Year-end charts

Certifications

References

Journey South albums
2006 debut albums
Covers albums
Albums produced by Brian Rawling
Albums produced by Steve Robson